Idol 2021 was the seventeenth season of the Swedish Idol series. The show will be broadcast on TV4 and starts on 23 August 2021. Judge  member Nikki Amini left the show after the sixteenth season.

On 27 May 2021, it was announced that Katia Mosally would replace Nikki Amini as new judge for this season.

Winner of this season was singer Birkir Blær.

Contestants

Gothenburg
 Alexandra Imper, 24 , Göteborg
 Daut Ajvaz, 18, Trollhättan
 Erik Elias Ekström, 28 , Kungälv
 Hamodi Jawad, 18 , Göteborg

Stockholm
 Amena Alsameai, 20, Vimmerby
 Birkir Blær Ódinsson, 21 , Göteborg
 Eduardo Lidvall, 18 , Åkersberga
 Lisa Hübbinette Sundström, 21, Stockholm (Örebro)
 Pär Lindberg, 28 , Örebro
 Siri Leijon, 16 , Svartsjö

Malmö
 Emma Petersson Håård, 19 , Malmö
 Jones Alsaadi, 19 , Malmö
 Lana Sulhav, 23 , Malmö
 Linus Gustafsson, 18 , Karlskrona

Umeå
 Annika Wickihalder, 20 , Örnsköldsvik
 Fredrik Lundman, 29 , Piteå
 Isabel Neib, 28 , Ankarsvik
 Philip Ström, 24 , Åshammar

Idolraketen
 Jacqline Mossberg Mounkassa, 23 , Stockholm

Last chance round
 Sunny Taylor, 20 , Billeberga

References

External links
Idol at TV4

2021